William Eugene Cody (born August 2, 1944) is a former professional American football linebacker in the National Football League (NFL). He played six seasons for the Detroit Lions (1966), the New Orleans Saints (1967–1970), and the Philadelphia Eagles (1972).

Cody was inducted into the Alabama Sports Hall of Fame in May 2014.

References

1944 births
Living people
People from Greenwood, Mississippi
Players of American football from Mississippi
American football linebackers
Auburn Tigers football players
New Orleans Saints players
Detroit Lions players
Philadelphia Eagles players